The 1994 Illinois gubernatorial election was held on November 8, 1994. Incumbent Republican Governor Jim Edgar won reelection in the greatest landslide in Illinois history, excepting the election of 1818. Edgar carried 101 of the state's 102 counties over the Democratic nominee, State Comptroller Dawn Clark Netsch, with Netsch only winning Gallatin County by a narrow margin. To date, this is the most recent statewide election in which Cook County voted for the Republican candidate and the most recent election in which a Republican governor won a second term in Illinois.

Election information
The primaries and general elections coincided with those for congress, as well as those for other state offices. The election was part of the 1994 Illinois elections.

The 1994 midterm elections saw a strong showing by the Republican Party, which was dubbed the "Republican Revolution".

Turnout
For the primaries, turnout for the gubernatorial primaries was 29.16%, with 1,794,357 votes cast and turnout for the lieutenant gubernatorial primaries was 23.44% with 1,442,160 votes cast. For the general election, turnout was 50.77%, with 3,106,556 votes cast.

Democratic primaries

Governor

Candidates
Roland Burris, Illinois Attorney General
James Elroy Gierach
Sheila A. Jones, perennial candidate
Dawn Clark Netsch, Illinois Comptroller
Richard Phelan, President of the Cook County Board of Commissioners

Results

Lieutenant governor

Candidates
Anthony P. Harper
Penny Severns, Illinois State Senator
Sheila Smith

Republican primaries

Governor

Candidates
Jim Edgar, incumbent governor
Jack Roeser, businessman

Results

Lieutenant governor

Candidates
Bob Kustra, incumbent lieutenant governor

Results

General election

Polling

Results

References

1994
Illinois
Gubernatorial